The New Mon State Party (NMSP) is an opposition party in Myanmar. Its armed wing, the Mon National Liberation Army (MNLA), has fought the government of Myanmar since 1949, but under different names. The NMSP has attempted many times unsuccessfully to push for constitutional and political reforms through the government sponsored National Convention. NMSP had signed a ceasefire pact with the government in 1995 but the pact turned invalid when the party refused to accept to transform itself into a border guard unit.

Current chair-person is Nai Hongsar, who has succeeded his predecessor Nai Htaw Mon due to health issues.

References

External links
New Mon State Party – ဗော်ဍုၚ်မန်တၟိ - Official site in Mon, retrieved 1 January 2021

Political parties in Myanmar
Politics of Myanmar
Rebel groups in Myanmar